= Genevois =

Genevois may refer to:

- the people of Geneva
- Genevois (province), a part of the former Duchy of Savoy
- a dialect of the Franco-Provençal language
